Craig Powell (born 30 December 1984) is a British recording artist and former frontman of the British dance act Uniting Nations. After leaving the musical band in March 2006, he has had top 20 chart success all over Europe, including United Kingdom, Germany, Poland, Switzerland and France. He is also a keen martial arts sportsman in karate, jujitsu, kickboxing and his main love is MMA (Mixed Martial Arts).

In Uniting Nations
Powell joined the British dance act Uniting Nations that was made up of Paul Keenan and Daz Sampson serving as musicians, songwriters and producers. Powell became the frontman of the band In 2004 with the songs "Out of Touch" and "You and Me".

Powell performed at many high end events including at Top of the Pops and appeared in the official music video of the song. The single "You and Me" reached #12 in the UK charts. The main vocals for the band's third single, "Ai No Corrida" a remake of a Quincy Jones hit, featured the vocals of Laura More also known for her vocals on Eric Prydz' hit "Call on Me". The remake reached #18 in the UK.

The band released their debut album One World after which Powell left the band in 2006.

Solo career
Powell continued a solo music career with 
success all over Europe. He performed at events like "Party in the Parks" across the UK and on Top of the Pops and appeared on many music channels including MTV.

In 2006 Craig worked with Nuxx Lmt and wrote the song "She Said" that was played in countries across Europe after which he left Nuxx Lmt.

In 2010, he released his solo dance single "No Way, No How". In 2011 Craig wrote "Can't Let You Go" and shot a unique music video in King's Lynn, Norfolk with over 70 fans travelling to play a role in the video shot. The video shows fans hugging their partners. Craig also toured making live appearances at parks and night venues to promote the new single.

Currently Craig continues to song write and also works on writing songs for other artists with songwriter John Matthews.

Sports
Powell is also a keen martial arts sportsman in karate, jujitsu, kickboxing and his main love is MMA (Mixed martial arts). At the end of 2011 Craig opened a mixed martial artist (MMA) gym called "The Den Fight Centre".

In 2013 Craig began competing in MMA fighting out of BKK fighters and went on to win the ECFF Bantamweight title.

In 2014 Powell began his Professional MMA career as a flyweight (57 kg).

References

External links
Official site

English male singers
Living people
1984 births
Place of birth missing (living people)
21st-century English singers
21st-century British male singers